Miranda July (born Miranda Jennifer Grossinger; February 15, 1974) is an American film director, screenwriter, singer, actress and author. Her body of work includes film, fiction, monologue, digital presentations and live performance art.

She wrote, directed and starred in the films Me and You and Everyone We Know (2005) and The Future (2011) and wrote and directed Kajillionaire (2020). She has authored a book of short stories, No One Belongs Here More Than You (2007); a collection of nonfiction short stories, It Chooses You (2011); and the novel The First Bad Man (2015).

Early life 
July was born in Barre, Vermont, in 1974, the daughter of Lindy Hough and Richard Grossinger. Her parents are both writers who taught at Goddard College at the time. They were also the founders of North Atlantic Books, a publisher of alternative health, martial arts, and spiritual titles. Her father was Jewish, and her mother was Protestant.

July is the cousin of American ballerina Skylar Brandt.

July was encouraged to work on her short fiction by author Rick Moody. She was raised in Berkeley, California, where she first began staging plays at 924 Gilman Street, a local punk rock club. She attended The College Preparatory School in Oakland for high school. When she was 16, she wrote and directed The Lifers, a play for which she cast 20 Latina women. She describes this as an experience that pushed her heavily. She later attended the film school at University of California Santa Cruz, but she dropped out during her second year, moving to Portland.

Career beginnings
She relocated to Portland, Oregon, and took up performance art, or "one woman shows". Her performances were successful; she has been quoted as saying she has not worked a day job since she was 23 years old. In an interview for the Tate, she explains that she still tries to practice performance, partially due to its stark differences from film making, such as its live audience or how "present" it is in comparison. Portland is also where she began participating in the riot grrrl scene that was beginning to grow in the early 1990s.

In the early stages of her film career, she created several small video projects and performances years prior to her feature film, Me and You and Everyone We Know. However, while she worked on her art, July had to work several odd jobs; she worked as a waitress, a tastemaker for Coca-Cola, a locksmith, and a stripper.

Film

Joanie4Jackie

July was immersed in the riot grrl scene in Portland and motivated by its do-it-yourself ethos, and she began an effort that she described as "a free alternative distribution system for women movie-makers". One of July's reasons for starting the project was to apply the concepts of riot grrrl into the film making world. The idea was to connect as many women artists as possible, let them see each other's work, and foster a sense of community. Participants sent a self-made short film to July, who mailed back a compilation videotape containing that film and nine others – a "chainletter tape". When it began in 1995, the project was called Big Miss Moviola but was soon renamed Joanie4Jackie. July also credits the project to the loneliness she was experiencing at the time, but felt she learned from the project immensely, saying "that was my film school". July's first film, Atlanta, appears on the second tape of the series. July continued to run the project for years, handing it off to the film department of Bard College in 2003.

In Spring 2016, July donated an archive of Joanie4Jackie to the Getty Research Institute. The collection includes more than 200 titles from the 1990s and 2000s, videos from Joanie4Jackie events, booklets, posters, hand-written letters from participants, and other documentation. Thomas W. Gaehtgens, the director of the Getty Research Institute, stated that the acquisition is "an esteemed addition to our Special Collections that connects to work by many important 20th century artists who are also represented in our archives, such as Eleanor Antin, Yvonne Rainer and Carolee Schneemann."

Me and You and Everyone We Know

Filmmaker rated her number one in their "25 New Faces of Indie Film" in 2004. After winning a slot in a Sundance workshop, she developed her first feature-length film, Me and You and Everyone We Know, which opened in 2005.

The film won The Caméra d'Or prize in The Cannes Festival 2005 as well as the Special Jury Prize at the Sundance Film Festival, Best First Feature at the Philadelphia Film Festival, Feature Audience Award for Best Narrative Feature at the San Francisco International Film Festival, and the Audience Award for Best Narrative Feature at the Los Angeles Film Festival.

The Future

On May 16, 2007, July mentioned that she was currently working on a new film. This film was originally titled "Satisfaction" but was later renamed The Future, with July in a lead role. The film premiered at the 2011 Sundance Film Festival and was nominated for a Golden Bear at the 61st Berlin International Film Festival.

Kajillionaire

In March 2018, it was announced July would write and direct a heist film, with Brad Pitt and Youree Henley producing the film, under their Plan B Entertainment and Annapurna Pictures banners, respectively. That same month, Evan Rachel Wood, Richard Jenkins, Debra Winger and Gina Rodriguez joined the cast of the film. In June 2018, Mark Ivanir joined the cast of the film. Principal photography began in May 2018. Its theatrical release was on September 25, 2020.

Other film work
Her short video The Amateurist (1998) features a dowdy researcher examining, via her own video monitor, a stereotypical "beautiful woman"; July plays both roles. A lengthier video, the 27-minute Nest of Tens (2000), juxtaposes four unrelated scenarios in which "seemingly everyday people go about acting completely normal while demonstrating distinct abnormality". Nest of Tens has been placed in the permanent online collection of the Metropolitan Museum of Art.
 
Wayne Wang consulted with July about aspects of his 2001 feature-length film The Center of the World, for which she received a story credit. July appears as herself in the 2017 documentary Turn It Around: The Story of East Bay Punk. She was interviewed for the film !Women Art Revolution. July narrates the documentary Fire of Love.

Music and spoken word
She recorded her first E.P. for Kill Rock Stars in 1996, titled Margie Ruskie Stops Time, with music by The Need. She released two full-length LPs, 10 Million Hours A Mile in 1997 and The Binet-Simon Test in 1998, both on Kill Rock Stars. She collaborated with Calvin Johnson in his musical project Dub Narcotic Sound System, and in 1999 she made a split EP with IQU, released on Johnson's K Records.

Acting

July has acted in many of her own short films, including Atlanta, The Amateurist, Nest of Tens, Are You The Favorite Person of Anyone?, and her feature-length films Me and You and Everyone We Know and The Future. She also made an appearance in the film Jesus' Son (1998). She appeared in an episode of Portlandia in 2012. She co-starred in Josephine Decker’s 2018 feature film, Madeline's Madeline.

Live performance pieces
In 1998, July made Love Diamond, her first full-length multimedia performance piece – in her description, a "live movie." This two-hour stage work had July playing multiple characters, humorously depicting women's perceived cultural roles. This was followed by a second full-length performance piece, The Swan Tool, and a six-minute film, Getting Stronger Every Day (2001). The latter is an abstract view of a grown man and a little girl, seemingly taunted by indistinct floating shapes while an offscreen narrator recounts a tale of real-life pedophilia. The Swan Tool is another "live movie", a one-woman show in which July plays Lisa Cobb, a woman searching for her lost body. Although it's peppered with deadpan comedy, the surrealist story concerns "childhood sexual traumas, adult alienation, and persistent, unfocused guilt".

In 2006, after completing her first feature film, she went on to create another multimedia piece, Things We Don't Understand and Definitely Are Not Going To Talk About, which she performed in Los Angeles, San Francisco, and New York. This stage show contained several ideas that would become key elements of her later film, The Future.

In March 2015, July premiered her performance work New Society as part of the 58th San Francisco International Film Festival. In the program for the performance, July requested the audience not share details of the show, stating it is now "a rare sensation to sit down in a theater with no idea what will happen."

Various art projects
With artist Harrell Fletcher, July founded the online art project called Learning to Love You More (2002–2009). The project's website offered assignments to artists whose submissions became part of "an ever-changing series of exhibitions, screenings and radio broadcasts presented all over the world". Over 8,000 people participated in the project. In addition to its internet presentations, Learning to Love You More also compiled exhibitions for the Whitney Museum, the Seattle Art Museum, and other hosts. A book version of the project's online art was released in 2007. Starting May 1, 2009 the project's website stopped accepting assignment submissions. In 2010 the San Francisco Museum of Modern Art acquired the website, to preserve it as an archive of the project online.

July constructed a sculptural exhibition, Eleven Heavy Things, for the 2009 Venice Biennale. Its assortment of cartoonish shapes, made sturdy with fiberglass and steel, were designed for playful interaction by visitors. The exhibition was also shown in New York City at Union Square Park and in Los Angeles at the MOCA Pacific Design Center.

In 2013 she organized We Think Alone, an art project involving the private emails of public figures. Unredacted except for the recipients' names, the emails were freely donated by a disparate group of notable persons including author Sheila Heti, theoretical physicist Lee Smolin, basketball player Kareem Abdul-Jabbar, and actress Kirsten Dunst. July grouped selected emails by topic, and sent a new set to the project's subscribers every week for 20 weeks. As one reviewer described them, the emails are "simultaneously mundane and eerily revealing; they shed light on how people in the public eye craft their private identities... [they] also underscore, in some way, the way all of us present ourselves over email: excessively formal or passive-aggressive, lovey-dovey, flakey, overly excited."

In 2014 she created an iOS app, Somebody, which allows users to compose a message to be delivered to someone else in-person, or to deliver someone else's message in-person. When you send your friend a message through Somebody, it goes – not to your friend – but to the Somebody user nearest your friend. This person (likely a stranger) delivers the message verbally, acting as your stand-in. Somebody is a far-reaching public art project that incites performance and twists our love of avatars and outsourcing – every relationship becomes a three-way. The project was funded by Miu Miu. The app closed on October 31, 2015.

In 2022 July collaborated with Mack Books to create Services, a limited edition book/sculpture composed of photographs and texts between July and Jay Benedicto, a trans woman living in the Philippines who offered services to increase the readership of self-published authors. The first six months of July and Benedicto's correspondence, which coincided with the first six months of North American lockdowns in response to the COVID-19 pandemic, were published in the book. Only 25 copies were made available for sale.

Writing
As much as a film-maker, July is also an author, mostly of short stories. Writing was something she did years before her first feature premiered. July in a 2016 interview explains that out of all the mediums she pursues, she is the least confident in her film making, partially because of the less familiar and hyper hierarchical and collaborative environment. She knows most people on her sets have never taken orders from a femme film director, and so she explains that there is an air of confidence you need to be that role.

Her short story The Boy from Lam Kien was published in 2005 by Cloverfield Press, as a special-edition book with illustration by Elinor Nissley and Emma Hedditch. Another short story, Something That Needs Nothing, was published in the following year by The New Yorker.

No One Belongs Here More Than YouNo One Belongs Here More Than You, July's collection of short vignettes, was published by Scribner in 2007.

It won the Frank O'Connor International Short Story Award on September 24, 2007. In The New York Times, Sheelah Kolhatkar gave the collection a mixed review: "A handful of these stories are sweet and revealing, although in many cases the attempt to create 'art' is too self-conscious, and the effort comes off as pointlessly strange."

As of 2015 the collection has more than 200,000 copies in circulation.

It Chooses You

July's non-fiction story collection It Chooses You was published by McSweeney's in 2011.

While procrastinating the writing of her screenplay The Future in 2009, July criss-crossed Los Angeles accompanied by photographer Brigitte Sire to meet a random selection of PennySaver sellers, glimpsing thirteen surprisingly moving and profoundly specific realities, along the way shaping her film, and herself, in unexpected ways. The work received mixed reviews with fans citing the collection's "lasting impression" of realistic struggle and critics citing the mumblecore-influenced artist's writing style as a "cheap trick" in text-format.

The First Bad Man
July's first novel The First Bad Man was published by Scribner in January 2015. The narrative centers around Cheryl Glickman, a middle-aged woman in crisis whose life abruptly changes course when a young woman, named Clee, moves into her home. The novel explores the complex relationship between Cheryl and Clee.

In her review for The New York Times Book Review, reviewer Lauren Groff writes The First Bad Man "makes for a wry, smart companion on any day. It's warm. It has a heartbeat and a pulse. This is a book that is painfully alive."

 Styles and themes 
July was heavily inspired by the riot grrrl movement. She was friends with several of the bands who were part of the movement such as Bikini Kill, Excuse 17, and Heavens to Betsy.

Her films have a common theme of "intimacy." For example, many of her work's titles use pronouns ("me," "you," "we," etc.). July creates "slice of life" films using ordinary characters and giving them attention within her films. She describes this as her being, "desperate to bring people together." However, as she's aged she's become more interested in how people sabotage coming together.

July receives criticism for being too "niche" or trying too hard to seem "quirky." According to The New York Times, "July has come to personify everything infuriating about the Etsy-shopping, Wes Anderson-quoting, McSweeney's-reading, coastal-living category of upscale urban bohemia that flourished in the aughts [sic]." She is often lumped in with directors like Wes Anderson and Noah Baumbach, but says she gets more push-back than them due to her films being so emotional and feminine, being called "precious" and "twee." In this same interview with The New York Times, July explains that she likes the directors she's been compared to, but they never get criticized for making films about themselves, though she as a female film-maker is often labelled "self-obsessed." In a 2015 Guardian article, July adds, "Yes, it's pretty clear that ‘whimsical’ is a diminishing word, [...] I almost think asking the question is like I'm being asked to gossip about myself. I think it's kind of a female thing, being asked to gossip about yourself. I think I'm maybe done with that."

July also often includes the theme of sex in her films. The New York Times describes this theme "as both a sudden surprise and a way to illuminate the inner lives of her characters". July elaborates: “I was always interested in sex, even as a kid. Sex includes shame and humiliation and fantasies and longing. It’s so dense with the kinds of things I’m interested in.”

She has also expressed her interest in the rhythm and feeling of film, rather than being “inspired” by other filmmakers, and states that she wouldn't call herself a “cinephile.”

In between Me and You and Everyone We Know and The Future, July began to incorporate some of the oddball avant-garde things she had done in theater performance into her films, some of which was easier to swallow on stage but not on screen, such as the talking cat in The Future, which she was later criticized for by viewers.

July also has a strong interest in clothing and costume. She served as the lookbook creative director for Uniqlo UT's 2019 clothing line.

Personal life
July is married to film-maker and visual artist Mike Mills, with whom she has a child, born in March 2012. July and Mills met at both of their first Sundance Festival premieres in 2005, and married in mid-2009.

In a 2007 interview with Bust magazine, July spoke of the importance which feminism has had in her life, saying, "What's confusing about [being a feminist]? It's just being pro-your ability to do what you need to do. It doesn't mean you don't love your boyfriend or whatever... When I say 'feminist', I mean that in the most complex, interesting, exciting way!" In another interview she had on Idaho's Public Television station, she explains that once she started confronting the racial issues addressed in current day politics, she started contacting publishers and revising her work, realizing not everything she had said was racially and politically sound.

She changed her last name to "July" when she was 15, after a character (based on her) in a story by her high school best friend, Johanna Fateman. She changed her name legally in her early 20s.

July describes her family as very "DIY", which probably accounts for some of July's makeshift style.  Therefore, when July wanted to change her last name, her father was very accepting of the decision. Her father was a workaholic, which is something she believes she picked up from him. Her family also dabbled in practicing New Age religions and discussed spirituality while she was growing up.

 Works 
 Filmography 
 Full-length films 
 Me and You and Everyone We Know (2005) – wrote, directed, and acted
 The Future  (2011) – wrote, directed, and acted
 Kajillionaire (2020) – wrote and directed

 Short films 
 I Started Out with Nothing and I Still Have Most of It Left Atlanta (1996) – appeared on Audio-Cinematic Mix Tape (Peripheral Produce)
 A Shape Called Horse (1999) – appeared on Video Fanzine #1 (Kill Rock Stars)
 Nest of Tens (1999) (Peripheral Produce)
 Getting Stronger Every Day (2001) – 6 mins 30 secs, appeared on Peripheral Produce: All-Time Greatest Hits: a collection of experimental films and videos (Peripheral Produce)
 Haysha Royko (2003) – 4 mins
 Are You the Favorite Person of Anybody? (2005) – appeared on Wholphin issue 1Somebody (2014), Miu Miu's Women's Tales 8 – 10 mins 14 secsMiranda July Introduces the Miranda (2014) – advertisement for a handbag designed by July and Welcome Companions. With music by JD Samson.

 Other film work 
 Fire of Love (2022) – narration by July
 Jesus' Son (1999) (Lions Gate Entertainment) – acted
 The Center of the World (2001) – co-wrote story
 Madeline's Madeline (2018) – acted
 Turn It Around: The Story of East Bay Punk (2017) – appearance as herself
 The Portland Girl Convention (1996) by Emily B. Kingan – documentary
 The Subconscious Art of Graffiti Removal (2001) by Matt McCormick – with narration by July

 Music videos 
"Get Up" by Sleater-Kinney (1999) – directed by July
"Top Ranking" by Blonde Redhead (2007) – July acts in the video, directed by Mike Mills
"Hurry On Home" by Sleater-Kinney (2019) – directed, plus a cameo appearance

 Publications 
 Full-length publications 
 No One Belongs Here More Than You: Stories. New York City: Scribner, 2007. .
 The First Bad Man: A Novel. New York City: Scribner, 2015. .
 Miranda July (artist monograph). Munich: Prestel Publishing, 2020. .

 Collaborative publications 
 Learning to Love You More. Munich: Prestel Publishing, 2007. With Harrell Fletcher. .
 It Chooses You. McSweeney's, Irregulars, 2011. With photographs by Brigitte Sire. .
 Services. Mack Books, 2021. With Jay Benedicto.

 Short stories 
 "Jack and Al" (Fall 2002) (Mississippi Review)
 "The Moves" (Spring 2003) (Tin House)
 "This Person" (Spring 2003) (Bridge Magazine)
 "Birthmark" (Spring 2003) (Paris Review)
 "Frances Gabe's Self Cleaning House" (Fall 2003) (Nest)
 "It Was Romance" (Fall 2003) (Harvard Review)
 "Making Love in 2003" (Fall 2003) (Paris Review)
 "The Man on the Stairs" (Spring/Summer 2004) (Fence Magazine])
 "The Boy from Lam Kien" Los Angeles: Cloverfield Press, 2005. .
 "The Shared Patio" (Winter 2005) (Zoetrope: All-Story)
 "Something That Needs Nothing" (September 18, 2006) (The New Yorker)
 "Majesty" (September 28, 2006) (Timothy McSweeney's Quarterly Concern)
 "The Swim Team" (January 2007) (Harper's Magazine)
 "Roy Spivey" (June 11, 2007) (The New Yorker)
 "The Metal Bowl" (September 4, 2017) (The New Yorker)

 Performances 
 Love Diamond (1998–2000)
 The Swan Tool (2000–2002)
 How I Learned to Draw (2002–2003)
 Things We Don't Understand and Are Definitely Not Going to Talk About (2006–2008)
 New Society (2015)

 Discography 
 Albums 
 10 Million Hours a Mile (1997) (Kill Rock Stars)
 The Binet-Simon Test (1998) (Kill Rock Stars)

 EPs 
 Margie Ruskie Stops Time EP (1996) with music by The Need (Kill Rock Stars)
 Girls on Dates split EP with IQU (1999) (K Records)

 Awards 
 1998: Andrea Frank Foundation Grant, given to nine American artists each year.
2002: Creative Capital Emerging Fields Award
2006: You, Me, and Everyone We Know received the Camera d’Or at the Cannes Film Festival and a Special Jury Prize at Sundance.
2007: No One Belongs Here More Than You won the Frank O’Connor award.
2016: July was one of 683 artists and executives invited to join the Academy of Motion Pictures Arts and Sciences as a writer.

 In popular culture 
 (Satirical piece)

See also
 List of female film and television directors

References

Further reading
 Czudaj, Antje. Miranda July's Intermedial Art: The Creative Class Between Self-Help and Individualism; Columbia University Press, 2016.

Mörke, Luise. "An Eerily Vulnerable Thing. Miranda July and the Failure of Profundity," Photogénie''. Retrieved February 16, 2021.

External links

 Joanie 4 Jackie : "Big Miss Moviola Chainletter"

 Ed Champion. Miranda July Interview - The Bat Segundo Show #405

1974 births
Living people
Actresses from Vermont
American feminists
American film actresses
American people of Jewish descent
American performance artists
Artists from Portland, Oregon
Feminist artists
Feminist musicians
Film directors from Oregon
American women film directors
K Records artists
Kill Rock Stars
Musicians from Vermont
Pacific Northwest artists
People from Barre, Vermont
Sundance Film Festival award winners
American women screenwriters
American short story writers
American women short story writers
Filmmakers from Portland, Oregon
Film directors from Vermont
Screenwriters from Oregon
Screenwriters from Vermont
Directors of Caméra d'Or winners
21st-century American women
Women in punk